Avrămești  (Hungarian pronunciation: , meaning "St. Abraham") is a commune in Harghita County, Romania. It lies in the Székely Land, an ethno-cultural region in eastern Transylvania.

Component villages 

The commune is composed of eight villages:

History 

Before the 1876 administrative reform of Transylvania, the village formed part of the Székely seat of Udvarhelyszék, then becoming, until 1918, a part of Udvarhely County in the Kingdom of Hungary. After the Treaty of Trianon of 1920, it became part of Romania.

Demographics
At the 2011 census, the commune had a population of 2,465; out of them, 2,105 (85.4%) were Hungarian, 278 (11.3%) were Roma and 17 (0.7%) were Romanian. 65% of the commune population are Unitarian, 17% are Reformed, 6% are Roman Catholic and 1% are Orthodox.

References

External links
 Home page of the commune 

Communes in Harghita County
Localities in Transylvania
Székely communities